The Rural Municipality of Buffalo No. 409 is a rural municipality (RM) in the Canadian province of Saskatchewan within Census Division No. 13 and  Division No. 6.

History 
The RM of Buffalo No. 409 incorporated as a rural municipality on December 13, 1909.

Geography

Communities and localities 
The following urban municipalities are surrounded by the RM.

Towns
 Wilkie

The following unincorporated communities are located within the RM.

Unincorporated hamlets
 Bush
 Cloan
 Phippen
 Red Pheasant
 Swarthmore
 Thackeray

Demographics 

Government 
The RM of Buffalo No. 409 is governed by an elected municipal council and an appointed administrator that meets on the second Monday of every month. The reeve of the RM is Leslie Kroschinski while its administrator is Sherry Huber. The RM's office is located in Wilkie.

See also 
List of rural municipalities in Saskatchewan

References 

B

Division No. 13, Saskatchewan